Konrad Szczotka (born 27 July 1995) is a Polish professional footballer who plays as a midfielder for Wisła Puławy.

References

External links

Living people
1995 births
Association football midfielders
Polish footballers
Place of birth missing (living people)
Wisła Puławy players